Gastromicans is a genus of jumping spiders that was first described by Cândido Firmino de Mello-Leitão in 1917.

Species
 it contains six species, found in Central America, Argentina, Bolivia, Paraguay, and Brazil:
Gastromicans albopilosa (Simon, 1903) (type) – Brazil, Paraguay
Gastromicans hondurensis (Peckham & Peckham, 1896) – Guatemala, Honduras
Gastromicans levispina (F. O. Pickard-Cambridge, 1901) – Panama
Gastromicans noxiosa (Simon, 1886) – Bolivia
Gastromicans tesselata (C. L. Koch, 1846) – Brazil
Gastromicans vigens (Peckham & Peckham, 1901) – Brazil, Argentina

References

External links
 Photographs of Gastromicans species from Brazil

Salticidae genera
Salticidae
Spiders of Central America
Spiders of South America
Taxa named by Cândido Firmino de Mello-Leitão